Nenad Džodić (Serbian Cyrillic: Ненад Џодић; born 4 January 1977) is a Serbian retired professional footballer who played as a defender.

Club career
After starting out his senior career with Zemun in his homeland, Džodić spent most of his playing years abroad, making over 300 appearances in the top two tiers of French football with Montpellier and Ajaccio combined.

International career
Džodić was capped five times for the national team of FR Yugoslavia in 2002.

Personal life
His son Stefan Džodić is a youth international footballer for Serbia.

Honours
Montpellier
 UEFA Intertoto Cup: 1999

Notes

References

External links
 
 

AC Ajaccio players
Association football defenders
Expatriate footballers in France
First League of Serbia and Montenegro players
FK Zemun players
Ligue 1 players
Ligue 2 players
Montpellier HSC players
Serbia and Montenegro expatriate footballers
Serbia and Montenegro footballers
Serbia and Montenegro expatriate sportspeople in France
Serbia and Montenegro international footballers
Serbia and Montenegro under-21 international footballers
Serbian expatriate footballers
Serbian expatriate sportspeople in France
Serbian footballers
Footballers from Belgrade
1977 births
Living people